KVRD-FM (105.7 FM) is a radio station broadcasting a country music format. It is licensed to Cottonwood, Arizona, United States. The station is currently owned by Yavapai Broadcasting Corporation and features programming from CNN Radio and Westwood One.

History
The station was assigned the call letters KURD-FM on 1989-10-18.  On 1989-11-20, the station changed its call sign to the current KVRD-FM.

References

External links
 

VRD-FM
Country radio stations in the United States
Radio stations established in 1989